The Riverside Convention Center is a convention center in downtown Riverside, California. The convention center hosts conventions and events in 70,000 sq. ft. of total meeting space and 30,000 sq. ft. of exhibit space. It has 26 meeting rooms with the largest room being 27,953 sq. ft. and the second largest room being 10,920 sq. ft.

History
The Convention Center was completely rebuilt in 2014 on the same site as the previous convention center. The convention center has hosted conventions, home and garden shows, conferences, meetings and weddings.

See also
 List of convention centers in the United States

References

External links
Riverside Convention Center
Riverside Convention and Visitors Bureau

Buildings and structures in Riverside, California
Convention centers in California
Tourist attractions in Riverside, California
Event venues established in 2014
2014 establishments in California